Roma was an electoral district of the Legislative Assembly in the Australian state of Queensland from 1950 to 1992.

It was named after the town of Roma, and comprises largely areas from the abolished districts of Dalby and Maranoa.

Roma was mostly a safe seat for the Country/National party, and was the seat of Premier Russell Cooper.

It was abolished in the 1991 redistribution under the Goss government, and its territory distributed between the new district of Western Downs and the existing district of Warrego.

Members for Roma

Election results

See also
 Electoral districts of Queensland
 Members of the Queensland Legislative Assembly by year
 :Category:Members of the Queensland Legislative Assembly by name

References

Former electoral districts of Queensland
Constituencies established in 1950
Constituencies disestablished in 1992
1950 establishments in Australia
1992 disestablishments in Australia